is a railway station in the city of Kariya, Aichi Prefecture,  Japan, operated by Meitetsu.

Lines

Station layout
The station has two opposed side platforms connected by a level crossing. The station has automatic turnstiles for the Tranpass system of magnetic fare cards, and is unattended.

Platforms

Adjacent stations

|-
!colspan=5|Nagoya Railroad

Station history
Hitotsugi Station was opened on 1 April 1923 as a station on the Aichi Electric Railway. On 1 April 1935, the Aichi Electric Railway merged with the Nagoya Railroad (the forerunner of present-day Meitetsu).

Passenger statistics
In fiscal 2017, the station was used by an average of 3432 passengers daily.

Surrounding area
Japan National Route 23
Japan National Route 1
 Karigane Elementary School

See also
 List of Railway Stations in Japan

External links

 Official web page

Railway stations in Japan opened in 1923
Railway stations in Aichi Prefecture
Stations of Nagoya Railroad
Kariya, Aichi